A race track (racetrack, racing track or racing circuit) is a facility built for racing of vehicles, athletes, or animals (e.g. horse racing or greyhound racing). A race track also may feature grandstands or concourses. Race tracks are also used in the study of animal locomotion.

A racetrack is a permanent facility or building. Racecourse is an alternate term for a horse racing track, found in countries such as the United Kingdom, India, Australia, Hong Kong, and the United Arab Emirates. Race tracks built for bicycles are known as velodromes. Circuit is a common alternate term for race track, given the circuit configuration of most race tracks, allowing races to occur over several laps. Some race tracks may also be known as speedways, or raceways.

A race course, as opposed to a racecourse, is a nonpermanent track for sports, particularly road running, water sports, road racing, or rallying. Many sports usually held on race tracks also can occur on temporary tracks, such as the Monaco Grand Prix in Formula One.

History
Some evidence remains of racetracks being developed in several ancient civilizations. The most developed ancient race tracks were the hippodromes of the Ancient Greeks and the circuses (circi) of the Roman Empire. Both of these structures were designed for horse and chariot racing. The stadium of the Circus Maximus in Ancient Rome could hold 200,000 spectators.

Racing facilities existed during the Middle Ages, and records exist  of a public racecourse being opened at Newmarket, in London, in 1174. In 1780, the Earl of Derby created a horse-racing course on his estate at Epsom; the English Derby continues to be held there today. Racecourses in the British Isles are based on grass, known as turf tracks. In the United States, the race tracks are soil.

With the advent of the automobile in the late 19th and early 20th centuries, race tracks were designed to suit the nature of powered machines. The earliest tracks were modified horse-racing courses. Racing automobiles in such facilities began in September 1896, at Narragansett Park in Cranston, Rhode Island. The Indianapolis Motor Speedway was opened in August 1909.

Beginning in the early 1900s, motorcycle races were run on high, banked, wooden race tracks called board tracks. During the 1920s, many of the races on the AAA Championship circuit were run on such board tracks.
Modern racetracks are designed with spectator safety being paramount, following incidents of spectator and track marshals fatalities. These often involve run-off areas, barriers, and high fencing.

Sports

Racetracks are used for:

Animal sports

 Camel racing
 Greyhound racing
 Harness racing
 Horse racing

Human sports
 Bobsleigh
 Cycle sport
 Skeleton (sport)
 Track and field

Motor sports
 Auto racing
 Drag racing
 Kart racing
 Motorcycle racing
 Stock car racing
 Track racing (motorcycles)
 Truck racing
 Drift racing

Configurations

Some racetracks offer little in the way of permanent infrastructure other than the track; others incorporate spectator facilities such as grandstands, hospitality or facilities for competitors, such as pit lanes and garages, paddocks and stables. Several racetracks are incorporated into larger venues or complexes, incorporating golf courses, museums, hotels, and conference centres. Some racetracks are small enough to be contained indoors, for sports such as motocross, track cycling, and athletics.

Many racetracks are multi-use, allowing different types of sport on the same track, or incorporating many tracks in one venue. Commonly, running tracks are incorporated within general use or soccer stadiums, either permanently visible or covered by stands or pitches.

Many horse and motorsport tracks are configurable, allowing different routes or sections. Some venues contain smaller tracks inside larger ones, with access tunnels and bridges for spectators. Some racetracks incorporate a short course and a longer course which uses part of the shorter one, usually the main straight, such as Brands Hatch. The Le Mans road race venue is centred on a smaller permanent circuit within its complex.

Surfaces

Surfaces include:

 All-weather running track (Tartan) (athletics)
 Artificial turf (electric radio controlled off-road racing)
 Asphalt/tarmac (motorsports, athletics, cycling)
 Carpet (electric radio controlled racing)
 Concrete (motorsports)
 Dirt (horses, greyhounds, automobiles, motorbikes (track racing), stock cars, radio controlled off-road racing, cycling)
 Grass (horses, amateur motorsports, cross country running)
 Ice (speed skating – when on dirt tracks, bobsleighs, speed skating, ice motor racing)
 Sand (horses, camels, greyhounds, rally raid)
 Wood (cycling) (board track racing – now defunct)

Motorsport

Race tracks are primarily designed for road racing competition through speed, featuring defined start-finish lines or posts, and sometimes even a series of defined timing points that divide the track into time sectors. A racetrack for cars (i.e. a car track) is a closed circuit, instead of a street circuit utilizing temporarily closed public roads.

Race tracks can host individual or team sports. Racetracks can feature rolling starts, or fixed starts, with associated equipment (starting blocks, cages, wheel traps etc.) They invariably feature a pit lane, and usually timing equipment.

Track layout
Some car tracks are of an oval shape, and can be banked, which allows almost universal spectator views or high speed racing (cycling, stock cars). A famous one is Nardò where high-speed manufacturer testing often takes place, and the Indianapolis Motor Speedway. Some oval tracks are variations on an oval shape, for practical reasons or to introduce varying difficulties such as Talladega (a tri-oval). Most race tracks have meandering circuits with many curves, chicanes and changes in height, to allow for a challenge in skill to the competitors, notably motocross and touring car racing – these tend to predominate throughout most of the world, but especially in Europe.

Road circuits

Flatter meandering motorsport courses are sometimes called 'road circuits', originating in the fact that the earliest road racing circuits were simply closed-off public roads. Some car racetracks are specifically configured in a long straight, namely drag racing.

True road circuits are still in use, e.g. the Australian GP has been run in Adelaide and continues to be in Melbourne on regular city streets. The most famous of these are the Monaco GP, and the Spa-Francorchamps circuit in Belgium. These are not permanent facilities built for racing.

Converted airfields
After World War II, many wartime airfields, particularly in Great Britain, were left without further use.  This coincided with a post-war boom in motorsport, and many airfields were converted to race tracks, where the circuit layout usually combined parts of the runways and the surrounding perimeter taxiways.  The famous British track at Silverstone is a former 
Class A airfield, as are Castle Combe and Goodwood. The long runways were perfect for drag strips such as at Santa Pod Raceway.  This type of track also appears on the popular motoring show Top Gear, which is filmed at Dunsfold Aerodrome, in Surrey, United kingdom

See also

 Animal locomotion
 Auto racing
 List of motor racing circuits by FIA grade
 List of horse racing venues

References

External links

trackpedia.com Worldwide Motor Racing track wiki
racingcircuits.net Worldwide Motor Racing track database
 When the going gets rough – tyres and track surfaces
AudioTrackGuides.co.uk Audio walkthroughs of motor racing circuits, for use with games.
Trackreviewers.com Motorsport Track Reviews and Information

Horse racing terminology

Sports venues by type